Jakrapun Kornburiteerachote (born 13 September 1968), or stage name Got Jakrapun (ก๊อท จักรพันธ์, formerly ก๊อต จักรพรรณ์), is a famous Thai Luk thung singer. His alias is Prince of Luk thung (เจ้าชายลูกทุ่ง). He has many popular songs including Ruk Koon Ying Gwah Krai, Som Wung Nah Krub, Tan Kwarm Kid Teung, Jai Sah Ra Parb, Tong Mee Suk Wan etc.

Early life
He was born in Nakhon Ratchasima. He is of American descent; His father was an American soldier and a Thai mother.

Musical career
At age 19, after leaving his hometown, he ended up in Pattaya singing in a dining club. This is where the talent scout for GMM Grammy, Mr. Katearun Lertpipak, found him and realized that he has found a treasure for Grammy. Katearun asked him to record his singing for him, which Jakrapun did and sent to him. Mr.Katearun was impressed and went to Rewat Buddhinan of Grammy immediately. After Rewat listened to the tape, he left the recording session and headed for Pattaya to see him. Rewat brought him to Grammy to be cultured and prepared to be the wonderful singer and performer that he is today. Rewat told him that many years ago "you will be rank first luk thung music star", and as usual he was right. He always gave Rewat thanks and credit for who he is today.

Discography

Studio albums 

 1992 : Shot (ช็อต) 
 1994 : Phraw Jai Mai Meuan Derm (เพราะใจไม่เหมือนเดิม)
 1997 : Look Toong Thailand 1 - Ruk Koon Ying Gwah Krai (ลูกทุ่งไทยแลนด์ 1 รักคุณยิ่งกว่าใคร)
 1998 : Look Toong Thailand 2 (ลูกทุ่งไทยแลนด์ 2)
 2001 : Look Toong Thailand 3 (ลูกทุ่งไทยแลนด์ 3)
 2003 : Jarern Jarern (เจริญ เจริญ)
 2007 : Kau Tot Tee Kid Teung (ขอโทษ...ที่คิดถึง)
 2009 : Koon OK Mai (คุณ OK ไหม)
 2011 : Phet Tut Phet (เพชรตัดเพชร)

Cover albums 

 1990 : Mae Mai Pleng Thai (แม่ไม้เพลงไทย) project - covers of Suraphol Sombatcharoen's songs
 1995-1996 : Hua Gaow Hua Wan 1-9 (หัวแก้วหัวแหวน) - covers of various and famous luk thung songs
 1998 : Neung Nai Siam 1-3 (หนึ่งในสยาม) - covers of famous luk krung songs
 2000 : Mon Pleng Suraphol 1-5 (มนต์เพลงสุรพล) - covers of Sombatcharoen's songs
 2005 : Taen Kwarm Kid Teung 1-2 (แทนความคิดถึง) - 1 original song and covers of various and famous luk thung songs
 2014 : Taen Kwarm Pook Pun 20 Pi Hua Gaow Hua Wan 9/1-2 (แทนความผูกพัน 20 ปี หัวแก้วหัวแหวน) - special luk thung cover album to celebrate the albums' 20 years anniversary

Philanthropy
In 2018, he donated millions to the Siriraj Hospital and Chulabhorn Hospital.

In 2020, he donated financial aid to seven hospitals during the COVID-19 pandemic.

References

1968 births
Living people
Jakrapun Kornburiteerachote
Jakrapun Kornburiteerachote
Jakrapun Kornburiteerachote
Jakrapun Kornburiteerachote